The 1991–92 Bulgarian Hockey League season was the 40th season of the Bulgarian Hockey League, the top level of ice hockey in Bulgaria. Five teams participated in the league, and HK Levski Sofia won the championship.

Standings

Final 
 HK Slavia Sofia - HK Levski Sofia 1:2 (2:4, 6:3, 1:5)

External links
 Season on hockeyarchives.info

Bulgarian Hockey League seasons
Bul
Bulg